The following is a comprehensive listing of the series of concert tours undertaken by Irish pop duo  Jedward.

Planet Jedward Tour

The Planet Jedward Tour was the duo's first national solo tour. It began in Castlebar, Ireland, on April 6, 2010. The Irish leg of the tour featured Ghetto Fabulous as the opening act. In November 2010, the duo did a second leg of the concert, in venues all across the UK. The British leg of the tour featured Shockolady as the opening act. he Irish Independent rated the tour positively, saying that "Jedwardmania is right up there with Beatlemania."

Setlist
The following songs were performed during the 25 April 2010 concert at Vicar Street in Dublin, Ireland. It does not represent all concerts during the tour. 
"I Gotta Feeling"
"Rock DJ"
"Oops!... I Did It Again"
"SOS"
"Break My Stride"
"We Will Rock You"
"Under Pressure (Ice Ice Baby)"
"Shake It"
"I'm Your Man"
"Jump"
"Pop Muzik"
"I Want Candy"
"Jump Around"
"All the Small Things"
"Bye, Bye, Baby (Baby Goodbye)"
Encore
"Ghostbusters"
"Under Pressure (Ice Ice Baby)" (Reprise)

Tour dates

Bad Behaviour Tour

The Bad Behaviour Tour is the duo's second national tour. The tour began in April 2011, with dates across Ireland. The second leg of the tour, which featured dates across the UK, began in June 2011. The tour was reworked with a circus theme to become the "Carnival Tour" for the second half of 2011 and early 2012.

Setlist
 "Bad Behaviour"
 "Born This Way"
 "In Too Deep"
 "All the Small Things"
 "I Want It That Way"
 "I Want You Back" / "ABC" / "I'll Be There"
 "Burnin' Up"
 "Distortion"
 "Ghostbusters"
 "Lipstick"
 "Baby One More Time"
 "Hold It Against Me"
 "Firework"
 "Bad"
 "Rock DJ"
 "We R Who We R"
 "Dirty Little Secrets"
 "They Don't Care About Us"
 "Year 3000"
 "Under Pressure (Ice Ice Baby)"

Tour dates

Festivals and other miscellaneous performances
County Wexford Strawberry Festival
Haigh Hall Live
Live at the Marquee
Arklow Seabreeze Festival
JFK Dunbrody Festival
Midsummer Magic
Weekend Summer Showbreak
Glasgow Show

Cancellations and rescheduled shows

Carnival Tour

The Carnival Tour is the third concert tour by Irish pop group, Jedward. The tour is essentially a re-working of their Spring 2011 tour. The first leg saw the duo return to Ireland, followed by a European tour after their appearance in Celebrity Big Brother 8. The third leg saw a tour of the UK and Ireland. Although not part of the tour, Jedward also took part in the Christmas panto, Jedward and the Beanstalk at the Olympia Theatre, Dublin between December 21 and January 8, 2012.

Setlist
"Circus" / "Funhouse"
"Yeah 3x"
"Wow Oh Wow"
"All the Small Things"
"Everyday Superstar"
"Saturday Night"
"As Long as You Love Me"
"Your Biggest Fan"
"Distortion"
"Ghostbusters"
Medley: "Hot Hot Hot" / "Boom, Boom, Boom, Boom" / "Who Let the Dogs Out?" / "Macarena" / "We Like to Party" / "On the Floor"
"Under Pressure (Ice Ice Baby)"
"Celebrity"
"Techno Girl"
"Pop Rocket"
"Firework"
"My Miss America"
"Who's That Chick?"
"Hold the World"
"Bad Behaviour"
"Lipstick"

Tour dates

Festivals and other miscellaneous performances
iPicnic Family Fun Day
Atlantic Sessions
Poptober
Hooley in the Park
Tallaght Family Day

Cancellations and rescheduled shows

Box office score data

Victory Tour

The Victory Tour was themed around the second Jedward album, Victory. It was the duo's second tour of Germany and Sweden, but their first time in Austria, Finland and Estonia. The second leg saw John and Edward do another tour of Ireland, while the third and final leg was the first time audiences saw the duo perform their Eurovision 2012 song "Waterline" live.

Setlist
The following songs were performed on 15 January 2012 at the Arena Wien in Vienna, Austria. It does not represent all concerts during the tour.
"Party Rock Anthem"
"Wow Oh Wow"
"All the Small Things" / "Teenage Kicks"
"Go Getter"
"Everyday Superstar"
"My Miss America"
"When You Look Me in the Eyes"
"Techno Girl"
"Distortion"
"Ghostbusters"
"Bad Behaviour"
"We Found Love"
"Celebrity"
"Saturday Night"
"I Wanna Go"
"Yeah 3x"
"Under Pressure (Ice Ice Baby)"
"Run the World (Girls)" / "Your Biggest Fan"
"Hold the World"
"Lipstick"

Tour dates

Festivals and other miscellaneous performances
Pop Picnic
Family Fun Day Out
Live at the Marquee
The Rhythm Fest
Dortmunder Music Week

Cancellations and rescheduled shows

Young Love Tour

On 25 May, a day before Jedward performed at the final of the Eurovision Song Contest 2012 in Baku, Azerbaijan, the duo announced dates for "The Young Love Tour" across Ireland starting in Killarney and ending in Limerick on 24 August.

Setlist
The following songs were performed during the 27 October 2013 concert at INEC Killarney in Killarney, Ireland. It does not represent all songs performed on tour. 
"Ghostbusters"
"A Girl Like You"
"I Love It" / "Pumped Up Kicks"
"Luminous"
"Give It Up"
"Happens in the Dark"
"What's Your Number?"
"Hall of Fame"
"Waterline"
"Boyfriend" / "Little Things" / "Hey There Delilah"
"Under Pressure (Ice Ice Baby)"
"Techno Girl"
"Suit & Tie"
"My Miss America"
"P.O.V."
"Chasing Cars"
"Fix You"
"Lipstick"
"All the Small Things"
"Cool Heroes"
"School's Out"
"Feel So Close"
"Young Love"

Tour dates

Festivals and other miscellaneous performances
Schlagerpopkvällen
Peamount Pulse Festival
Rose of Tralee Street Carnival
Summer Pop

A Night for Christy(Aslan) Benefit Concert in Dublin

Guilfest (UK)

Cancellations and rescheduled shows

References

Jedward
Concert tours